The first modern police force, commonly said to be the London Metropolitan Police, established in 1829, promoted the preventive role of police as a deterrent to urban crime and disorder.

Law enforcement, however, has only ever constituted a small portion of policing activity.
Policing has included an array of activities in different contexts, but the predominant ones are concerned with the preservation of order and the provision of services.

History
In some societies, in the late 18th century and early 19th century, these developed within the context of maintaining a layered societal structure and the protection of property.
In the United Kingdom in the late 18th century: 

In the United States in the 19th century: 

In 1690 John Locke wrote that:

Similarly, Adam Smith described how:

This close link between property and government (and thus police function) was also noted by John Jay, who repeatedly said that:

According to Monaghan, this:  and by US Founding Father James Madison. who declared that government:

Considering the state of law enforcement and society in 2013, Dr. Gary Potter  states,

Law enforcement power

See also
The Thin Blue Line
Law enforcement agency
 State police
 Police

References

History of law enforcement